The Natal multimammate mouse (Mastomys natalensis) is a species of rodent in the family Muridae. It is also known as the Natal multimammate rat, the common African rat, or the African soft-furred mouse. The Natal multimammate rat is the natural host of the Lassa fever virus.

Range
It is found in Africa south of the Sahara.  Six different genetic groups can be distinguished in different regions: one in western Africa, one in central Africa, one in southern Africa and three in eastern Africa.

Habitat
Its natural habitats are subtropical or tropical dry forest, subtropical or tropical moist lowland forest, dry savanna, moist savanna, subtropical or tropical dry shrubland, subtropical or tropical moist shrubland, arable land, pastureland, rural gardens, urban areas, irrigated land, and seasonally flooded agricultural land.

These rats associate closely with humans, and are commonly found in and around African villages.

Interactions with humans
The species has been used as a laboratory animal since 1939. It has great value for researchers who focused on stomach cancer and spontaneous tumors. It is also the most important reservoir of Lassa fever virus.

References

External links
 Granjon, L., Lavrenchenko, L., Corti, M., Coetzee, N. & Rahman, E.A. 2004.  Mastomys natalensis.   2006 IUCN Red List of Threatened Species.   Downloaded on 9 July 2007.

Tofts, Russell. Multimammate Mice. Retrieved July 14, 2009.

Mastomys
Rodents of Africa
Stored-product pests
Mammals described in 1834
Taxonomy articles created by Polbot
Rodents as pets